Dairy Farmers of Canada (DFC) is an advocacy group created in 1934, when a number of related groups merged to form a single entity for representing the interests of dairy farmers.

Profile 

The group represents dairy farmers living on over 10,000 farms across Canada. The organization is headquartered in Ottawa, with marketing activities being led from a satellite Montreal office. DFC's goal is to create favourable operating conditions for the Canadian dairy industry. It works to influence public policies that will maintain the viability of Canadian dairy producers and promotes the health benefits of dairy products.

The organization is run for producers, by producers. Dairy producers fund its operation, including promotional activities.

History 

The group has represented Canadian dairy farmers since 1934. Originally called the Canadian Federation of Milk Producers, it was part of the National Dairy Council (an organization representing dairy processors). The  organization was renamed "Dairy Farmers of Canada" in 1942.

On February 1, 1994, Dairy Farmers of Canada merged with the Dairy Bureau of Canada, the national non-profit organization responsible for the overall promotion of Canadian dairy products. All policy, marketing, nutrition and market research activities were regrouped under the newly formed organization, which retained the name "Dairy Farmers of Canada". Shortly after the merger, the organization launched the "100% Canadian Milk" campaign, which still exists today and adopted the current alternative cow logo.

DFC members include dairy farmer organizations from all the Canadian provinces. It is a member of the non-profit Canadian Federation of Agriculture.

A recent initiative by the organization was to have dairy products that contained 100 percent Canadian dairy products indicated by using a specific label that states, "100% Canadian milk". A follow-up study investigating the impact of such a label revealed that Canadians were willing to pay more money for dairy products that specified using 100 percent Canadian milk products, versus its non-Canadian certified counterparts.

In January 2019, the federal government of Canada gave $2.7 million to the organization.

Certification of origin logo 

The Dairy Farmers of Canada "Quality Milk" logo is used to help consumers identify products that contain 100% Canadian milk and Canadian dairy products. Introduced November 1, 2016, the new logo will gradually replace the previous origin logo which was commonly known as the "Little Blue Cow".

References

External links 
 

Canadian lobbyists
Lobbying in Canada
Lobbying organizations in Canada
Agricultural organizations based in Canada
Dairy organizations
Dairy farming in Canada
1934 establishments in Ontario
Advocacy groups in Canada